is a player character from the Tekken fighting game franchise by Bandai Namco Entertainment. Making his debut in the original Tekken in 1994, he is one of two characters (the other only being Nina Williams) to appear playable in every installment of the main series .

Paul is a short-tempered biker and judoka who repeatedly enters the series' King of Iron Fist tournaments in hopes of winning the prize money and to prove he is the world's best fighter, despite his enviable career, he has yet to win the one tournament that would mark him as being one of the true greats, all while developing  rivalries with Kazuya Mishima and the anthropomorphized fighting bear Kuma. He is the only guy to ever fight Kazuya Mishima to a draw, and one of only two people to beat Jin Kazama in a tournament match (the second being Hwoarang). He has received mixed critical responses for his personality and his signature hi-top fade hairstyle and has been considered a joke character following his later Tekken series appearances.

Appearances

In video games
Paul Phoenix is a hotheaded American biker and martial artist who regularly enters the King of Iron Fist fighting tournaments to prove he is "the toughest fighter in the universe" while hoping to use the prize money to pay off his debts, yet he falls short of victory each time due to various circumstances. In the first Tekken, Paul performed well in the first King of Iron Fist Tournament, and he went to go on to face Kazuya Mishima in the semi-finals but he was narrowly defeated after a furious battle that lasted for hours. Shaking his head in disbelief, Paul left the Mishima estate and returned to New York. He battles his way to the finals of the King of Iron Fist Tournament 2 in Tekken 2, earning the right to have a rematch with Kazuya Mishima, only to end up having to forfeit and replaced by Heihachi Mishima after getting stuck in traffic as a result of a multi-car collision on the expressway, and therefore unable to make the match on time. Paul goes undefeated throughout the entire King of Iron Fist Tournament 3 in Tekken 3, leaving victorious after defeating the opposing fighters including Kuma, Jin Kazama, and the god of fighting, Ogre. Unbeknownst to him, Ogre morphs into his monstrous form, True Ogre, after absorbing Heihachi's fighting force and is then defeated a second time by Paul's replacement Jin, who was reinstated in the tournament and cheating Paul out of his victory. As a result, by Tekken 4, Paul's dojo has gone out of business due to lack of students and he ends up a homeless alcoholic. He again enters the King of Iron Fist Tournament 4 in an attempt to get his life back together and go head-to-head with Kazuya, a rival he hadn't fought in over 20 years.

During the first two competitions, Paul had fought and defeated Kuma, a large brown bear trained in combat by Heihachi. After the animal dies of old age, Heihachi trains a replacement, also named Kuma, who was easily defeated by Paul in the third tournament but Kuma manages to defeat him in the early stages of the fourth tournament. Paul adopts a new training regimen and gets his revenge against Kuma in the King of Iron Fist Tournament 5 in Tekken 5, but the match leaves Paul too exhausted to continue in the competition and he is forced to drop out. Again departing the tournament penniless and already burdened by his increasing debt, he wastes no time in entering the King of Iron Fist Tournament 6 in Tekken 6 in hopes of finally easing his financial troubles. This time, he believes assembling a team would increase his chances of victory, and so he joins forces with old friend  Marshall Law and boxer Steve Fox.
While they did well in the tournament, Paul and Law ended up being paired against each other and they both fought to a draw, as a result they were unable to claim the top prize. 

Paul is selectable in noncanonical spinoff Tekken games such as Tekken Tag Tournament, Tekken Card Challenge, Tekken Advance, Tekken Tag Tournament 2, and Tekken Revolution, in addition to the crossover fighting game Street Fighter X Tekken. He is an unlockable character in the 2005 beat-'em-up multiplayer game Urban Reign. He also appears in SNK's mobile phone game The King of Fighters All Star. Paul appears as a Spirit in the Nintendo crossover video game Super Smash Bros. Ultimate.

Design and gameplay
Tekken producer Katsuhiro Harada revealed that Paul was inspired by Japanese manga, specifically Jean Pierre Polnareff from the JoJo's Bizarre Adventure series. Paul is canonically 25 years old at the time of his 1994 Tekken debut. His default costume throughout the series is a red sleeveless judogi and black padded gloves, sporting a scorpion tattoo on his right arm. Paul is given a new look for Tekken 7, with his red gi replaced with casual costumes featuring red, white, and blue themes. A downloadable costume for Paul in Street Fighter X Tekken resembles Street Fighter character Rufus.

Paul's fighting style is officially classified as "judo". Though some of his move sets evident he has a hybrid martial arts that incorporates his judo with those of Kyokushin karate and bajiquan. GameSpy considered Paul "one of the most devastating characters" in Tekken 6, with "one of the best low attacks" and a "powerful wall game". Neidel Crisan of 1UP.com wrote of Paul in Street Fighter X Tekken that he had "a fairly straight forward character with solid combos that may not be flashy, but do a ton of damage," but Tristan Damen of VentureBeat claimed that "Paul Phoenix, a powerhouse in his native series, is neutered by his inability to fling fireballs."

In other media and merchandise
Paul makes a cameo appearance in Tekken: The Motion Picture as one of the tournament competitors, and is seen carrying an unconscious Michelle Chang out of the exploding Mishima resort near the conclusion, while he has no dialogue. He additionally had main and minor roles in several Tekken comic book series published between 1997 and 2017.

In 1998, Epoch Co. released an action figure of Paul in a black leather outfit as part of their Tekken 3 collection, which was packaged with a display stand and an extra set of interchangeable hands.

Reception

Paul has received mixed critical reviews for his gameplay, characterization, and distinctive hairstyle. Matt Swider of Gaming Target ranked him the tenth-best Tekken character in 2006. In his 2012 preview of Street Fighter X Tekken, Nate Ming of Crunchyroll described Paul and Marshall Law as "get-rich-quick schemers". Kevin Wong of Complex ranked Paul third among his twenty best Tekken characters in 2013. Wesley Yin-Poole of Eurogamer wrote that Paul was his preferred character to play in the original PlayStation port of Tekken 3 due to his design and hard-hitting punch. In 2015, Dan Paradis of WatchMojo ranked Paul as the fifth-best Tekken character: "He’s a rugged American fighter trying to become 'The Toughest Guy in the Universe,' and it’s hard to imagine someone questioning his claim on the title," while Gavin Jasper of Den of Geek wrote in 2016 that Paul was deserving of being the central character in an eighth Tekken installment. In an official fan poll held by Namco in 2012, Paul was the third-most requested Tekken character for inclusion in Tekken X Street Fighter, receiving 15.83% (13,975) of 88,280 votes.

Rich Knight of Complex ranked Paul's "ridiculous" Tekken 5 ending second in his 2012 list of the series' fifteen "craziest" moments. 4thletter.net ranked it 127th in their 2013 selection of the top 200 fighting game endings, while comparing him to Street Fighter joke character Dan Hibiki. While Street Fighter: Assassin's Fist actor Joey Ansah called Paul his favorite Tekken character in a 2014 interview, he was critical of Paul's role in later series installments as "a fucking joke." 

Print advertising for Tekken 2 featured the slogan: "Paul Phoenix is about to face 23 fighters. Who's the first person he should kill? His barber." In 2010, Michael Grimm of GamesRadar expressed his desire for a matchup between Paul and Street Fighter character Guile for the then-unreleased Street Fighter X Tekken, citing "their awful hair." Tom Goulter of GamesRadar described it as "Street Fighter's Ken [having] stuck his finger in an electrical socket." Alex Langley of Arcade Sushi rated it among the "10 Greatest Video Game Character Hairdos" in 2013. Liana Kerzner of 411Mania.com rated it fourth in her selection of the "Top 8 Video Game Hairstyles" that same year: "Paul takes the title of King of the Stupid Hair, even if he can never quite win a fighting tournament." ShortList included Paul in a feature titled "The Rules of Video Game Hairstyles": "How he manages to maintain such a cliff-like structure is beyond our grooming knowledge. Oceans of hair spray?"

References

Fictional bodyguards in video games
Fictional American people in video games
Fictional martial artists in video games
Fictional Brazilian jiu-jitsu practitioners
Fictional characters from New York (state)
Fictional characters from New York City
Fictional judoka
Fictional kickboxers
Fictional kyokushin kaikan practitioners
Fictional wushu practitioners
Fictional mixed martial artists
Male characters in video games
Tekken characters
Video game characters with superhuman strength
Video game characters introduced in 1994